The Liberal Democratic Union is a political party in Albania.

History
It was founded in 1995 with the name Social Democratic Union of Albania. The party began as a breakaway faction of the Social Democratic Party of Albania. The break-away was motivated by the Social Democratic Party leaving the governing coalition with the Democratic Party and the desire of some members to maintain their ministerial posts or other high governmental appointments. Initially, the break-away faction, consisting of those wanting to keep their posts, was known as the Social Democratic Union, later changing its name to the Liberal Democratic Union.

In the 2001 elections it was part of the Union for Victory (Bashkimi për Fitoren) coalition which received 37.1% of the vote and 46 members of parliament. On its own, the Liberal Democratic Union consistently has received under 1% of the vote in general elections.

In the 2005 elections, BLD was part of the Alliance for Freedom, Justice, and Welfare. BLD won one seat through the proportional quota of the Democratic Party of Albania. It did not itself receive sufficient votes for any representation in Parliament.

See also
Liberalism
Contributions to liberal theory
Liberalism worldwide
List of liberal parties
Liberal democracy
Liberalism in Albania

References

External links
Bashkimi Liberal Demokrat

1995 establishments in Albania
Centrist parties in Albania
Liberal parties in Albania
Political parties established in 1995
Political parties in Albania
Social democratic parties in Albania